The 1980 Crossley Carpets Tournament, also known as the Chichester Tournament,  was a women's tennis tournament played on outdoor grass courts at Oaklands Park in Chichester in England. The event was part of the AA category of the Colgate Series that was part of the 1980 WTA Tour. It was the tenth and last edition of the tournament and was held from 8 June until 14 June 1980. First-seeded Chris Evert-Lloyd won the singles title and earned $20,000 first-prize money.

Finals

Singles
 Chris Evert-Lloyd defeated  Evonne Goolagong Cawley 6–3, 6–7(4–7), 7–5
It was Evert-Lloyd's 3rd singles title of the year and the 96th of her career.

Doubles
 Pam Shriver /  Betty Stöve defeated  Rosie Casals /  Wendy Turnbull 6–4, 7–5

Prize money

Notes

References

External links
 International Tennis Federation (ITF) tournament details

Crossley Carpets Trophy
1980 in English tennis
Chichester Tennis Tournament